The 1964 NHRA Winternationals (commonly known as the Winternats) were a National Hot Rod Association (NHRA) drag racing event, held at Auto Club Raceway, Pomona, California on 16 February.

Results

Top Fuel

Round One 
Don "Big Daddy" Garlits attended, but Swamp Rat VI-A failed to qualify; Garlits, however, took over the Weekly-Rivero-Fox-Holding dragster qualified by Norm Weekly. He eliminated Bobby Vodnik. Denny Milani lost to Chris "The Greek" Karamesines, while "TV Tommy" Ivo defeated Jim Warren.

Round Two 
Garlits fell to Kenny Safford. Karamesines lost to Ivo.

Semi-final 
Ivo defeated Safford.

Final 
Ivo faced Jack Williams, and lost.

Top Gas 
Danny Ongais, driving a Roland Leong-owned Chevrolet, defeated Mickey Thompson's Ford.

Altered 
The Comp Eliminator (Altered) title went to Charlie Smith, in a Chevrolet-powered 1923 Model T, over the Chevrolet-powered 1932 Bantam of Ed Weddle.

Stock Experimental 
Ronnie Sox took the S/X win over "Dyno Don" Nicholson, both driving 1964 Mercury Comets.

Top Stock
The T/S title went to Tommy Grove, who defeated Doug Lovegrove..

Street Eliminator 
The Street Eliminator win went to Ron Rootyl in a 1963 Dodge, defeating  Norman Armstrong in a Chevrolet-powered 1939 Willys.

Notes 

 1964 in motorsport
NHRA Winternationals
1964 in California